Stuart Blair Donaldson (born 5 September 1991) is a Scottish National Party (SNP) politician in the United Kingdom. He served as the Member of Parliament (MP) for West Aberdeenshire and Kincardine from the 2015 general election until being unseated at the general election on 8 June 2017, by Andrew Bowie of the Conservative Party.

Early life
Donaldson was born in the north east of Scotland. He is the son of Maureen Watt MSP, former Scottish Public Health Minister, and the grandson of Hamish Watt MP.

He was educated at Durris Primary School and Banchory Academy. He attended the University of Glasgow and graduated with an undergraduate Master of Arts (MA) degree in 2013.

Political career
Following graduation, Donaldson worked as a parliamentary assistant for Christian Allard MSP.

At the 2015 general election, he was elected the Member of Parliament (MP) for West Aberdeenshire and Kincardine. He was 23 years old, making him one of eight Scottish National Party MPs under 30. He lost his seat in 2017, aged 25, to the Conservative Andrew Bowie.

After leaving Parliament 
In 2018, Donaldson joined the public affairs team of the Campaign for Real Ale, based at its head office in St Albans.

References

External links

 
 SNP profile

1991 births
Alumni of the University of Glasgow
Living people
Members of the Parliament of the United Kingdom for Scottish constituencies
People educated at Banchory Academy
Politicians from Aberdeen
Scottish National Party MPs
UK MPs 2015–2017